Mangar Lual is a  boma in Tiar-aleit Payam, Ajak County, Aweil State, South Sudan.

Demographics 
According to the Fifth Population and Housing Census of Sudan, conducted in April 2008, Mangar Lual  boma had a population of 4,395 people, composed of 1,890 male and 2,505 female residents.

Notes

References 

Populated places in South Sudan